Carsten Tank Nielsen (18 December 1818 – 1 August 1892) was a Norwegian civil servant and government official. He was the first director of the Norwegian Telegraph (Telegrafverket now Telenor) from 1854 until his death in 1892. He and his wife Alvilde Olsen (1821–1890) were the parents of the historian and politician, Yngvar Nielsen.

References 

1818 births
1892 deaths
Civil servants from Oslo
Directors of government agencies of Norway
Recipients of the St. Olav's Medal
Order of the Dannebrog
Order of the Polar Star
Order of Vasa
Burials at the Cemetery of Our Saviour